is a sub-kilometer asteroid, classified as near-Earth object of the Aten group, that is a temporary horseshoe companion to the Earth. It is the 11th known Earth horseshoe librator. Prior to a close encounter with the Earth on 15 December 2015,  was an Apollo asteroid.

Discovery 

 was discovered on 16 December 2015 by G. J. Leonard and R. G. Matheny observing
for the Catalina Sky Survey. As of 9 March 2016, it has been observed 47 times with an observation arc of 5 days.

Orbit and orbital evolution 

 is currently an Aten asteroid (Earth-crossing but with a period less than a year). Its semi-major axis (currently 0.99753 AU) is similar to that of Earth (1.00074 AU), but it has a moderate eccentricity (0.2791) and very low orbital inclination (1.6249°). It alternates between being an Aten asteroid and being an Apollo asteroid, although its orbital evolution is rather chaotic. As of 9 March 2016, this object is the 16th known Earth co-orbital and the 11th known object following a horseshoe path with respect to our planet. Asteroid  follows an asymmetrical horseshoe path with respect to our planet; the value of its relative mean longitude oscillates about 180°, but enclosing 0°.

Physical properties 

With an absolute magnitude of 27.4 mag, it has a diameter in the range 9–22 meters (for an assumed albedo range of 0.04–0.20, respectively).

See also 

 54509 YORP
 
 3753 Cruithne

Notes 

  This is assuming an albedo of 0.20–0.04.

References 

Further reading
 Understanding the Distribution of Near-Earth Asteroids Bottke, W. F., Jedicke, R., Morbidelli, A., Petit, J.-M., Gladman, B. 2000, Science, Vol. 288, Issue 5474, pp. 2190–2194.
 A Numerical Survey of Transient Co-orbitals of the Terrestrial Planets Christou, A. A. 2000, Icarus, Vol. 144, Issue 1, pp. 1–20.
 Debiased Orbital and Absolute Magnitude Distribution of the Near-Earth Objects Bottke, W. F., Morbidelli, A., Jedicke, R., Petit, J.-M., Levison, H. F., Michel, P., Metcalfe, T. S. 2002, Icarus, Vol. 156, Issue 2, pp. 399–433.
 Transient co-orbital asteroids Brasser, R., Innanen, K. A., Connors, M., Veillet, C., Wiegert, P., Mikkola, S., Chodas, P. W. 2004, Icarus, Vol. 171, Issue 1, pp. 102–109.
 A trio of horseshoes: past, present and future dynamical evolution of Earth co-orbital asteroids 2015 XX169, 2015 YA and 2015 YQ1 de la Fuente Marcos, C., de la Fuente Marcos, R. 2016, Astrophysics and Space Science, Vol. 361, Issue 4, article 121 (13 pp).

External links 
 Discovery MPEC 
  data at MPC
 ADS MPEC record
 
 
 

Minor planet object articles (unnumbered)
Earth-crossing asteroids

20151216